Francis Oumar Belonga (born 13 March 1978) is a retired Chadian footballer who is currently a coach of Elect-Sport FC.

Career
He has also played as striker for Bontang PKT in the Indonesia Super League.

See also
 List of Chad international footballers

References

External links 
 

1978 births
Living people
Chadian footballers
Chad international footballers
Expatriate footballers in Indonesia
Expatriate footballers in Cameroon
Expatriate footballers in Angola
Chadian expatriates in Cameroon
Expatriate footballers in Gabon
Atlético Petróleos de Luanda players
People from N'Djamena
Association football forwards